The Jewish Leadership Council (previously known as the Jewish Community Leadership Council) is an organisation in the United Kingdom, founded in 2003, whose declared aim is to forward the interests of the organised Jewish community in Britain. The council was founded by its first chairman, then president of the Board of Deputies of British Jews, Henry Grunwald, and a number of other senior UK Jewish leaders. The council acts as an umbrella group for various Jewish community organizations, charities, Zionist and pro-Israel advocacy groups.

Mission
The JLC states that its mission is to connect and co-ordinate the Jewish charitable sector, to strengthen and support leadership across the Jewish community and to magnify and amplify the JLC members' voices.

The JLC represents the largest Jewish organisations in the UK, including synagogues, care organisations, education charities, regional Representative Councils and the Board of Deputies of British Jews.

From supporting the long-term aims of the community through data-led research to connecting members to each other, government and public institutions relevant to their work, the JLC works to build and maintain a thriving UK Jewish community. It works across the community regardless of religious, cultural, political affiliations or beliefs.

Leadership and management

Chair
In January 2022, Keith Black, CEO of the Regatta Group, became chair. Before this, the position was held by Jonathan Goldstein from May 2017 until January 2022.
From 2009 to 2017 Mick Davis, chairman of the United Jewish Israel Appeal, was in the role. He was the first chairman of the council's executive committee.

CEO
Claudia Mendoza and Michelle Janes were appointed joint chief executives in 2020. They took over from Simon Johnson, a former Football Association executive, who held the CEO position from 2013 to 2020. Before this, Jeremy Newmark (former spokesperson for the Chief Rabbi Lord Sacks) held the CEO position from January 2006 until 2013. Under Newmark, the organisation increased its expenditure from £192,000 in 2007 to £2,782,000 in 2013.

Membership
The JLC brings together the most senior lay leaders of the major institutions in each sector of UK Jewish life. Membership includes the chairs and presidents of synagogue movements, leaders of the main charities, welfare organisations and representative bodies as well as a group of vice-presidents comprising a number of Jewish VIPs and individual leaders such as Lord Levy, Sir Ronald Cohen, Lord Woolf, Lord Fink, Sir Trevor Chinn, Leo Noe and former board president and politician Lord Janner of Braunstone.

The Jewish Leadership Council's member organisations are the major institutions of UK Jewish life. Together, they touch on every aspect of Jewish life, from synagogues to social care organisations, political bodies to youth movements, community centres and charities. The JLC believes that bringing these different perspectives together helps joined-up and coherent thinking about the Jewish community.

The JLC's current constituent members are:

 Britain Israel Communications and Research Centre
 The Board of Deputies of British Jews
 Camp Simcha
 Chai Cancer Care
 Community Security Trust
 The Fed
 Jami
 Jewish Care
 Jewish Museum London
 Jewish Women's Aid
 W3
 Kisharon
 Langdon
 Lead
 Liberal Judaism
 Leeds Jewish Representative Council
 London Jewish Forum
 Maccabi GB
 Jewish Representative Council for Greater Manchester and Region
 Masorti Judaism
 Mitzvah Day
 The Movement for Reform Judaism
 Nightingale Hammerson
 Norwood
 Partnerships for Jewish Schools
 S&P Sephardi Community
 University Jewish Chaplaincy
 UJIA
 Union of Jewish Students
 United Synagogue
 Women's International Zionist Organization  UK
 Work Avenue
 World Jewish Relief
 Zionist Federation of Great Britain and Ireland
 Zionist Youth Council

Connecting and co-ordinating the Jewish community

Cross-community collaboration
The JLC works and aspires to facilitate long-term strategic planning for communal life. It aims to increase and improve co-ordination, cooperation, collaboration and (where appropriate) consolidate resources to enhance the effectiveness and impact of Jewish communal organisations. The JLC has the ability to bring individuals and organisations together to share challenges and solutions. The JLC connects and co-ordinates member organisations, be this through the JLC CEO Forum and Council Meetings or cross-communal fora such as the HR Forum and a new Fundraising Forum.

The JLC sees itself as an integral part of the support network to members. JLC is a central point of expertise member charities and organisations can refer to, helping them to locate resources and find others who can help resolve issues. It also has the ability to co-ordinate members in line with their values and purpose  A recent example of this type of work undertaken by the JLC is the establishment of the Jewish Community Refugee Task Force in March 2022 with the Board of Deputies of British Jews to ensure that the Jewish community could provide a co-ordinated, needs-led and effective response to the refugee crisis caused by the Russian invasion of Ukraine.

Nationwide advocacy
Regional managers at the JLC ensure that the breadth of the Jewish community has people advocating on their behalf. Together, they build relationships with MPs, local councils, and regional mayors in London, the North West, and North East. This country-wide focus allows the JLC to think strategically and locally about the continued vitality of the Jewish community in the UK. The JLC supports the London Jewish Forum and Jewish Representative Council of Greater Manchester and Region through a close working relationship and staffing of these organisations.

Jewish youth movements
The JLC created Reshet in response to joint research with UJIA on the informal (out of school) provisions available for young people in the UK Jewish community. Originally starting as a network that brings together the many Jewish youth movements, today Reshet also act as the primary provider of safeguarding expertise and training in the Jewish community.  It has led the central community response to the Independent Inquiry into Child Sexual Abuse (IICSA) and provided training for communal bodies in safeguarding.

Strengthening and supporting the Jewish community

Nurturing the Jewish leaders of tomorrow
The JLC works to create the leaders of tomorrow. In 2008, the council launched the 'New Leadership Network', a project designed to create a forum for the development of the next generation heads of the major agencies of the UK Jewish community. This then developed into Lead, established in 2011, which is the leadership development arm of the JLC. It is the only organisation of its kind working cross-communally in the UK Jewish community to offer leadership programmes, events, and networking opportunities for trustees, lay, professional, and emerging communal leaders.

Digital development
The JLC has created the community's first Digital Development Project which aims to support community leaders and organisations to increase and improve use of digital tools to enhance their productivity and effectiveness. Underpinned by the JLC's ability to bring Jewish community organisations together to learn from each other.

Thinking long term about the UK Jewish community
The JLC continues to be data-driven in its decision-making and strategic thinking. Informed and supported by guidance from the Institute for Jewish Policy Research (JPR), the JLC are helping co-ordinate members and communal organisations through a charity income survey. Through this piece of research, planned in 2021 and due to be carried out in 2022, we are seeking to understand the impact of COVID-19 on Jewish community organisations’ ability to secure funds over the last two years. The survey will also explore emerging fundraising trends and changes. The JLC will then share best practice and lessons learnt across the participating organisations to support fundraising efforts across the community.

The JLC work with JPR (the Institute Jewish Policy Research) to support efforts to create a Jewish population research panel to understand long-term trends and to help strategically inform their work and that of their members. Most recently this has included in-depth research into the community's response to COVID-19 and, through PaJeS, analysing the most recent Census data alongside assessing future schools’ provision.

Supporting Jewish schools
The JLC prides itself on identifying and tackling key communal challenges. A key example of this is the recognition by the JLC of the need for greater support for Jewish Schools. From research undertaken and subsequent investment in response, the Partnership for Jewish School (PaJeS) was formed in 2011. The Council published a report on the impact of its 2008 Commission on Jewish Schools, and the work of the JLC Schools Strategy Implementation Group. The report was launched by JLC Vice-president Leo Noe and Secretary of State for Education, Nick Gibb at a gathering of 200 key figures from the Jewish schools sector. The Chief Rabbi Lord Sacks and Policy Exchange Chairman Daniel Finkelstein also spoke at the launch of PaJeS. In 2021 the JLC celebrated PaJeS moving to a sustainable independent organisation.

PaJeS, now a JLC member, helps plan strategically for the continued provision of sufficient Jewish school places and works to maintain the schools' continued excellence.

Magnifying and amplifying the Jewish community
The JLC seeks to magnify and amplify the work of its members, raising the profile of their causes, campaigns, and initiatives. It aims to connect members to decision-makers at all levels of government and provide access to those in positions of power, able to support change. It also magnifies and amplifies the work of its members within the community, using their own platform and various fora, to increase awareness about workstreams, projects and campaigns.

The JLC fosters relationships with policymakers. This ranges from organising various government roundtable meetings to fostering the ongoing positive relationships with regional Mayors, MPs from all political parties, and council leaders and councillors from across the country. We also promote the work of our members, facilitating meetings with Ministers, Secretaries of State, and their counterparts from the Opposition. Thanks to these relationships, we have been able to support 90% of English councils adopting the IHRA definition of antisemitism and helped the NHS raise awareness of COVID-19 safety and increase vaccine uptake amongst the Haredi community.

The JLC works with its members to provide and collaborate on original, tailored social content that helps elevate and publicise their campaigns. In addition to this, as part of our Digital Development Project, it organises consultancy and networking groups that enable peer learning.

Other

Israel
In December 2006, the Jewish Leadership Council and the Board of Deputies of British Jews formed the Fair Play Campaign Group, a pro-Israel advocacy organization. The Fair Play Campaign co-ordinates activity against anti-Israel boycotts and other anti-Zionist campaigns.

In December 2009, the Council sought and published a legal opinion from Lord Pannick advocating a change in UK law to prevent the issuing of arrest warrants against Israeli leaders without prior consent of the Attorney General.

In June 2011, together with BICOM and the Board of Deputies, Council Chair Vivian Wineman, Chair of Trustees Mick Davis and CEO Jeremy Newmark, met Foreign Secretary William Hague to discuss developments in the Middle East.

Criticism
The Jewish Leadership Council has previously been criticised as self-appointed and unaccountable. Deputies have in the past noted that, while Board honorary officers are accountable to deputies, who themselves are accountable to their constituencies, the JLC had no such governance structure.

In February 2018, The Jewish Chronicle published an internal audit report into the conduct of Jeremy Newmark, while he was CEO of the council between 2006 and 2013, that alleged that he deceived the council out of "tens of thousands of pounds". The Jewish Chronicle claimed the council had covered up the former CEO's alleged behaviour, and accepted a resignation on the grounds of ill health. Newmark denied any wrongdoing, though he resigned as Chair of the Jewish Labour Movement two days later. The Charity Commission stated it had not been informed of these allegations of financial impropriety in 2013 which raised serious potential regulatory concerns which it was assessing. In March 2018, a three-member panel, with Charity Commission approval, began investigating the allegations. In February 2019, a police investigation was also opened. The panel later said that it could not quantify any missing funds due to the absence of key documents and records. The police closed their investigation in March 2019.

References

External links
 The JLC website
 Articles about the Jewish Leadership Council on the Times of Israel

Jewish organisations based in the United Kingdom
Organisations based in the London Borough of Barnet
Organizations established in 2003
2003 establishments in the United Kingdom
Organisations based in London
Zionism in the United Kingdom